Lasionycta macleani is a moth of the family Noctuidae. It is known only from the east or southeast slope Mount McLean.

It is found at or above timberline.

External links
A Revision of Lasionycta Aurivillius (Lepidoptera, Noctuidae) for North America and notes on Eurasian species, with descriptions of 17 new species, 6 new subspecies, a new genus, and two new species of Tricholita Grote

Lasionycta
Moths of North America
Moths described in 1927